Kanaranzi Creek is a stream in the U.S. states of Iowa and Minnesota.

The name Kanaranzi comes from the Dakota word for "where the Kansas were killed".

See also
List of rivers of Iowa
List of rivers of Minnesota

References

Rivers of Lyon County, Iowa
Rivers of Nobles County, Minnesota
Rivers of Rock County, Minnesota
Rivers of Iowa
Rivers of Minnesota